Freddie King (September 3, 1934December 28, 1976) was an American blues guitarist, singer and songwriter. He is considered one of the "Three Kings of the Blues Guitar" (along with Albert King and B.B. King, none of whom were blood related). Mostly known for his soulful and powerful voice and distinctive guitar playing, King had a major influence on electric blues music and on many later blues guitarists.

Born in Gilmer, Texas, King became acquainted with the guitar at the age of six. He started learning the guitar from his mother and his uncle. King moved to Chicago when he was a teenager; there he formed his first band the Every Hour Blues Boys with guitarist Jimmie Lee Robinson and drummer Frank "Sonny" Scott. As he was repeatedly being rejected by Chess Records, he got signed to Federal Records, and got his break with single "Have You Ever Loved a Woman" and instrumental "Hide Away", which reached number five on the Billboard magazine's rhythm and blues chart in 1961. It later became a blues standard. King based his guitar style on Texas blues and Chicago blues influences. The album Freddy King Sings showcased his singing talents and included the record chart hits "You've Got to Love Her with a Feeling" and "I'm Tore Down". He later became involved with producers who were more oriented to rhythm and blues and rock and was one of the first bluesmen to have a multiracial backing band at performances.
 
He was inducted into the Rock and Roll Hall of Fame by ZZ Top in 2012 and into the Blues Hall of Fame in 1982. His instrumental "Hide Away" was included in the Rock and Roll Hall of Fame's list of "500 Songs that Shaped Rock". He was ranked 25th in the Rolling Stone magazine's 2003 edition of "100 Greatest Guitarists of All Time" and 15th in the 2011 edition.

Biography

1934–1952: Early life
According to his birth certificate he was named Fred King, and his parents were Ella Mae King and J. T. Christian. When Freddie was six years old, his mother and his uncle began teaching him to play the guitar. In autumn 1949, he and his family moved from Dallas to the South Side of Chicago.

In 1952 King started working in a steel mill. In the same year he married another Texas native, Jessie Burnett. They had seven children.

1952–1959: Move to Chicago and early works
Almost as soon as he had moved to Chicago, King started sneaking into South Side nightclubs, where he heard blues performed by Muddy Waters, Howlin' Wolf, T-Bone Walker, Elmore James, and Sonny Boy Williamson. King formed his first band, the Every Hour Blues Boys, with the guitarist Jimmie Lee Robinson and the drummer Frank "Sonny" Scott. In 1952, while employed at a steel mill, the eighteen-year-old King occasionally worked as a sideman with such bands as the Little Sonny Cooper Band and Earl Payton's Blues Cats. In 1953 he recorded with the latter for Parrot Records, but these recordings were never released. As the 1950s progressed, King played with several of Muddy Waters's sidemen and other Chicago mainstays, including the guitarists Jimmy Rogers, Robert Lockwood Jr., Eddie Taylor, and Hound Dog Taylor; the bassist Willie Dixon; the pianist Memphis Slim; and the harmonicist Little Walter.

In 1956 he cut his first record as a leader, for El-Bee Records. The A-side was "Country Boy", a duet with Margaret Whitfield. The B-side was a King vocal. Both tracks feature the guitar of Robert Lockwood, Jr., who during these years was also adding rhythm backing and fills to Little Walter's records.

King was repeatedly rejected in auditions for the South Side's Chess Records, the premier blues label, which was the home of Muddy Waters, Howlin' Wolf, and Little Walter. The complaint was that King sang too much like B.B. King. A newer blues scene, lively with nightclubs and upstart record companies, was burgeoning on the West Side, though. The bassist and producer Willie Dixon, during a period of estrangement from Chess in the late 1950s, asked King to come to Cobra Records for a session, but the results have never been heard. Meanwhile, King established himself as perhaps the biggest musical force on the West Side. He played along with Magic Sam and reputedly played backing guitar, uncredited, on some of Sam's tracks for Mel London's Chief and Age labels, though King does not stand out on them.

1959–1966: Federal Records
In 1959 King got to know Sonny Thompson, a pianist, producer, and A&R man for Cincinnati's King Records. King Records' owner, Syd Nathan, signed King to the subsidiary Federal Records in 1960. King recorded his debut single for the label on August 26, 1960: "Have You Ever Loved a Woman" backed with "You've Got to Love Her with a Feeling" (again credited as "Freddy" King). From the same recording session at the King Studios in Cincinnati, Ohio, King cut the instrumental "Hide Away", which the next year reached number five on the R&B chart and number 29 on the Pop chart, an unprecedented accomplishment for a blues instrumental at a time when the genre was still largely unknown to white audiences. It was originally released as the B-side of "I Love the Woman". "Hide Away" was King's melange of a theme by Hound Dog Taylor and parts by others, such as "The Walk", by Jimmy McCracklin, and "Peter Gunn", as credited by King. The title of the tune refers to Mel's Hide Away Lounge, a popular blues club on the West Side of Chicago. Willie Dixon later claimed that he had recorded King performing "Hide Away" for Cobra Records in the late 1950s, but such a version has never surfaced. "Hide Away" became a blues standard.

After their success with "Hide Away", King and Thompson recorded thirty instrumentals, including "The Stumble", "Just Pickin'", "Sen-Sa-Shun", "Side Tracked", "San-Ho-Zay", "High Rise", and "The Sad Nite Owl". They recorded vocal tracks throughout this period but often released the tunes as instrumentals on albums.

During the Federal period, King toured with many notable R&B artists of the day, including Sam Cooke, Jackie Wilson, and James Brown.

1966–1974: Cotillion, Shelter, RSO Records

King's contract with Federal expired in 1966, by which time he had moved back to Dallas from Chicago, and his first overseas tour followed in 1967. His availability was noticed by the producer and saxophonist King Curtis, who had recorded a cover of "Hide Away", with Cornell Dupree on guitar, in 1962. Curtis signed King to Atlantic in 1968, which resulted in two LPs, Freddie King Is a Blues Master (1969) and My Feeling for the Blues (1970), produced by Curtis for the Atlantic subsidiary Cotillion Records.

In 1969 King hired Jack Calmes as his manager, who secured him an appearance at the 1969 Texas Pop Festival, alongside Led Zeppelin and others, and this led to King's signing a recording contract with Shelter Records, a new label established by the rock pianist Leon Russell and the record producer Denny Cordell and recorded at their studio, The Church Studio in Tulsa, Oklahoma. The company treated King as an important artist, flying him to Chicago to the former Chess studios to record the album Getting Ready and providing a lineup of top session musicians, including Russell. Three albums were made during this period, including blues classics and new songs, such as "Going Down", written by Don Nix.

King performed alongside the big rock acts of the day, such as Eric Clapton and Grand Funk Railroad (whose song "We're an American Band" mentions King in its lyrics), and for a young, mainly white audience, along with the white tour drummer Gary Carnes, for three years, before signing with RSO Records. In 1974 he recorded Burglar, for which Tom Dowd produced the track "Sugar Sweet" at Criteria Studios in Miami, with the guitarists Clapton and George Terry, the drummer Jamie Oldaker and the bassist Carl Radle. Mike Vernon produced the other tracks. Vernon also produced a second album for King, Larger than Life,
for the same label. Vernon brought in other notable musicians for both albums, such as Bobby Tench of the Jeff Beck Group, to complement King.

Death
Nearly constant touring took its toll on King—he was on the road almost 300 days out of the year. In 1976 he began suffering from stomach ulcers. His health quickly deteriorated, and he died on December 28 of complications from this illness and acute pancreatitis, at the age of 42.

According to those who knew him, King's untimely death was due to stress, a legendary "hard-partying lifestyle", and a poor diet of consuming Bloody Marys because as he told a journalist, "they've got food in them."

Musical style
King had an intuitive style, often creating guitar parts with vocal nuances. He achieved this by using the open-string sound associated with Texas blues and the raw, screaming tones of West Side, Chicago blues. King's combination of the Texas and Chicago sounds gave his music a more contemporary feel than that of many Chicago bands who were still performing 1950s-style music, and he befriended the younger generation of blues musicians. In his early career he played a solid-body gold-top Gibson Les Paul with P-90 pickups. He later played several slimline semi-hollow body Gibson electric guitars, including an ES-335, ES-345, and ES-355.  He used a plastic thumb pick and a metal index-finger pick.

Legacy
By proclamation of the governor of Texas, Ann Richards, September 3, 1993, was declared Freddie King Day, an honor reserved for Texas legends, such as Bob Wills and Buddy Holly.  He was inducted into the Rock and Roll Hall of Fame in 2012, and placed 15th in Rolling Stone magazine's list of the 100 greatest guitarists of all time.

Several of King's early 1960s instrumentals found their way into the repertoire of surf music bands: "Those instrumental hits Freddy King had – 'Hideaway', 'San-Ho-Zay', 'The Stumble' – [t]he way white kids were relating to it was like surf guitar in a way; instrumental music that you could dance to."  One band that mixed R&B and surf instrumentals occasionally included Jerry Garcia. He later explained: "When I started playing electric guitar the second time, with the Warlocks, it was a Freddie King album that I got almost all my ideas off of, his phrasing really. That first one, Here's Freddie King, later it came out as Freddie King Plays Surfin' Music or something like that, it has 'San-Ho-Zay' on it and 'Sensation" and all those instrumentals" (King's 1961 instrumental album, Let's Hide Away and Dance Away with Freddy King, was retitled Freddy King Goes Surfin'  for a 1963 re-release).

According to music critic Cub Koda, King has influenced guitarists such as Eric Clapton, Mick Taylor, Stevie Ray Vaughan, and Lonnie Mack. In Michael Corcoran's words, King "merged the most vibrant characteristics of both [Chicago and Texas] regional styles and became the biggest guitar hero of the mid-sixties British blues revivalists, who included Eric Clapton, Savoy Brown, Chicken Shack, and Peter Green-era Fleetwood Mac". Clapton said in 1985 that King's 1961 song "I Love the Woman" was "the first time I heard that electric lead-guitar style, with the bent notes ... [it] started me on my path." He later added in an interview with Dan Forte of Guitar World that King's guitar playing on his rendition of "I Got a Woman": "That just sent me into a complete kind of ecstasy, and it scared the shit out of me.  I'd never heard anything like it, and I thought I'd never get anywhere near it.  And I know now that I never will, but it was what immediately made me want to carry on."  As Rolling Stone later wrote, "Clapton shared his love of King with fellow British guitar heroes Peter Green, Jeff Beck and Mick Taylor, all of whom were profoundly influenced by King's sharpened-treble tone and curt melodic hooks on iconic singles such as 'The Stumble,' 'I'm Tore Down' and 'Someday, After Awhile.'"

King was among many pioneering African-American blues musicians to embrace the British blues scene and tour its club circuit in the late 1960s. Robert Christgau credited King's embrace of Britain with creating his renown as a pioneer of electric blues guitar. In Gary Graff's MusicHound Rock (1996), the entry on King states: "Although his reputation rests with his guitar, King also sang with an underrated, powerful style. His lasting influence has insured Freddie King's recognition as one of the great postwar blues masters."

Appraisal of recording work 
Recommending what albums of King's music to hear, MusicHound Rock cited the 1993 Rhino compilation The Best of Freddie King, for focusing on "the fruitful abundance" of his recordings for King Records (1961–66), and the 1995 Black Top CD Live at the Electric Ballroom, 1974, for its "blasting, ripping concert" recording along with "a rare pair of acoustic" performances; Freddie King Is a Blues Master (1969) and My Feeling for the Blues (1970) were named records to avoid, as they "both suffer from thin accompaniment, too little guitar and reedy vocals". John Swenson, writing in The Rolling Stone Jazz & Blues Guide (1999), also recommended the Electric Ballroom recording, along with "Home Cooking's Live at the Texas Opry House (documenting a 1976 show in Houston)", saying they are "the best antidotes to King's lackluster studio work from these years".

In his only review of a King album, The Best of Freddie King (1975) by Shelter Records, Christgau wrote in Christgau's Record Guide: Rock Albums of the Seventies (1981) that the 1971–73 recordings are "a bunch of Leon Russell and Don Nix boogies, [King's] voice blurred, his guitar all fake and roll." He added that, while the guitarist had recorded some "acute R&B" singles early in his career, he later "coast[ed] for years". However, in a review of King's 1974 album Burglar for AllMusic, Joe Viglione called it "entertaining and concise" and believed the album "stands as a solid representation of an important musician which is as enjoyable as it is historic".

Discography

Studio albums
{| class="wikitable plainrowheaders" style="text-align:center;"
|+ List of studio albums with year, title, record label, and chart peak
! scope="col" width="50" rowspan="2" | Year
! scope="col" width="380" rowspan="2" | Title
! scope="col" width="120" rowspan="2" | Label(Cat. No.)
! scope="col" width="100" colspan="2" | Peak chartposition
|-
! R&B
! US
|-
|rowspan="2"|1961
! scope="row" | Freddy King Sings
| King (762)
|
|
|-
! scope="row" | Let's Hide Away and Dance Away with Freddy King
| King (773)
|
|
|-
| 1962
! scope="row" | Boy – Girl – Boy Freddy King, Lulu Reed & Sonny Thompson
| King (777)
|
|
|-
|rowspan="2"|1963
! scope="row" | Bossa Nova and Blues
| King (821)
|
|
|-
! scope="row" | Freddy King Goes Surfin'''
| King (856)
|
|
|-
|rowspan="1"|1965
! scope="row" | Gives You a Bonanza of Instrumentals| King (928)
|
|
|-
| 1969
! scope="row" | Freddie King Is a Blues Master| Cotillion (SD 9004)
|
|
|-
| 1970
! scope="row" | My Feeling for the Blues| Cotillion (SD 9016)
|
|
|-
| 1971
! scope="row" | Getting Ready...| Shelter (SW8905)
|
|
|-
| 1972
! scope="row" | Texas Cannonball| Shelter (SW8913)
|
|
|-
| 1973
! scope="row" | Woman Across the River| Shelter (SW8921)
| 54
| 158
|-
| 1974
! scope="row" | Burglar| RSO (SO4803)
| 53
|
|-
| 1975
! scope="row" | Larger Than Life| RSO (SO4811)
|
|
|}

Selected compilation albums
{| class="wikitable plainrowheaders" style="text-align:center;"
|+ List of selected compilation albums with year, title, label, and chart peak
! scope="col" width="50" rowspan="2" | Year
! scope="col" width="380" rowspan="2" | Title
! scope="col" width="120" rowspan="2" | Label(Cat. No.)
! scope="col" width="100" colspan="2" | Peak chartposition
|-
! R&B
! US
|-
| 1966
! scope="row" | Vocals and Instrumentals| King (964)
|
| 
|-
| 1975
! scope="row" | The Best of Freddie King| Shelter (SR-2140)
|
|
|-
| 1977
! scope="row" | Freddie King 1934–1976| RSO (RS-1-3025)
|
|
|-
| 1986
! scope="row" | Just Pickin'| Modern Blues (MB2LP-721)
|
|
|-
| 1992
! scope="row" | Blues Guitar Hero: The Influential Early Sessions| Ace (CDCHD 454)
|
|
|-
| 1993
! scope="row" | Hide Away: The Best of Freddie King| Rhino (R2 71510)
|
|
|-
| 2000
! scope="row" | The Best of Freddie King: The Shelter Records Years| The Right Stuff (72435-27245-2-9)
|
|
|-
| 2002
! scope="row" | Blues Guitar Hero Volume 2| Ace (CDCHD 861)
| 
|
|-
| 2009
! scope="row" | Taking Care of Business| Bear Family (BCD 16979 GK)
|
|
|-
| 2010
! scope="row" | Texas Flyer 1974–1976| Bear Family (BCD 16778 EK)
|
|
|-
|}

Charting singles

References

Bibliography
Busby, Mark (2004). The Southwest. Greenwood Publishing Group. .
Clapton, Eric (2007). Clapton: The Autobiography. Broadway Books. Digitized September 4, 2008. .
Corcoran, Michael (2005). All Over the Map: True Heroes of Texas Music. University of Texas Press. .
Forte, Dan (2000). "Freddie King". In Rollin' and Tumblin': The Postwar Blues Guitarists. Jas Obrecht, ed. San Francisco: Miller Freeman Books. pp. 275–280. , 978-0-87930-613-7.
Hardy, Phil; Laing, Dave; Stephen, Barnard; Perretta, Don (1988). Encyclopedia of Rock. 2nd ed., rev. Schirmer Books. Digitized December 21, 2006. .
Koster, Rick (2000). Texas Music. St. Martin's Press. .
Lawrence, Robb (2008). The Early Years of the Les Paul Legacy 1915–1963. Hal Leonard. .
O'Neal, Jim; Van Singel, Amy (2002). The Voice of the Blues: Classic Interviews from Living Blues Magazine. 10th ed. Routledge. .
Pruter, Robert (1992). Chicago Soul''. 5th ed., reprint. University of Illinois Press. .

External links 
 Official website
 
 
 Freddy King at 45cat.com

1934 births
1976 deaths
African-American guitarists
African-American male  singer-songwriters
American blues guitarists
American male guitarists
American blues singers
American rhythm and blues musicians
Apex Records artists
Electric blues musicians
Federal Records artists
King Records artists
Lead guitarists
Musicians from Dallas
People from Longview, Texas
RSO Records artists
Burials at Sparkman-Hillcrest Memorial Park Cemetery
Texas blues musicians
20th-century American guitarists
Singer-songwriters from Texas
Guitarists from Texas
People from Gilmer, Texas
P-Vine Records artists
20th-century American male singers
20th-century American singers
20th-century African-American male singers